The 2015 Copa Libertadores Femenina was the 7th edition of the Copa Libertadores Femenina, South America's premier women's club football tournament organized by CONMEBOL. The tournament was held in the city of Medellín, Colombia, from 28 October to 8 November 2015. It was the first time the tournament is hosted outside Brazil.

The final was won by Ferroviária 3–1 over Colo-Colo the sixth time a Brazilian team has won the title.

Teams
The competition was contested by 12 teams: the title holder, the champion club from each of the ten CONMEBOL member associations, and one additional team from the host association Colombia.

Notes

Venues
The tournament was played in four venues in three cities, all in the Metropolitan Area of Medellín:
Estadio Atanasio Girardot, Medellín
Estadio Cincuentenario, Medellín
Estadio Municipal, Girardota
Estadio Polideportivo Sur, Envigado

Match officials
A total of 10 referees and 10 assistant referees (one each per association) were appointed for the tournament.

Format

The same format as last year was used:
The 12 teams were divided into three groups of four in the first stage, where each group was played on a round-robin basis.
The winners of each group and the best runner-up among all groups advanced to the second stage, which were played on a single-elimination basis.
The semifinal matchups were:
Group A winner vs. Group B winner
Group C winner vs. Best runner-up
The semifinal winners and losers played in the final and third place match respectively.

Draw
The draw of the tournament was held on 16 October 2015 during the CONMEBOL Executive Committee meeting at the Hyatt Hotel in Santiago, Chile. The 12 teams were drawn into three groups of four containing one team from each of the four seeding pots.

First stage
The schedule of the tournament was announced on 20 October 2015.

The teams were ranked according to points (3 points for a win, 1 point for a draw, 0 points for a loss). If tied on points, tiebreakers would be applied in the following order:
Goal difference in all games;
Goals scored in all games;
Head-to-head result in games between tied teams;
Drawing of lots.

All times local, COT (UTC−5).

Group A

''São José v Cerro Porteño was suspended after 50 minutes due to heavy rain. It was resumed on 1 November 2015, 14:15, at the Estadio Atanasio Girardot, Medellín.

Group B

Group C

Ranking of second-placed teams

Second stage
If tied after regulation time, the penalty shoot-out would be used to determine the winner (no extra time would be played).

Bracket

Semifinals

Third place match

Final
Colo-Colo played in their third final. They lost in 2011 and won the trophy in 2012. For Ferroviária it was their first final. As in every previous edition, a Brazilian team was playing in the final.

Top goalscorers
Catalina Usme won the top-scorer award with eight goals in three matches.

References

External links
Copa Libertadores Femenina Colombia 2015, CONMEBOL.com

2015
2015 in women's association football
2015 in South American football
2015 in Colombian football
Sport in Medellín
International club association football competitions hosted by Colombia